Walela Nehanda is a Black non-binary writer, cultural worker, cancer & stem cell transplant survivor, and mental health advocate from Los Angeles, California.

In 2020, Nehanda was featured on the 26th Annual Out100 list. In 2022, they were chosen to be a Zoeglossia fellow.

Nehanda's book, Bless the Blood, will be released in spring 2024 through Penguin Random House.

Early life

Mental health struggles and advocacy 
As a teenager, Nehanda volunteered at a crisis hotline for people contemplating suicide.

Nehanda struggled with self-harm growing up as a way of coping with overwhelming feelings of anger and hurt. They began getting tattoos as a way to cover scarification, which eventually evolved into a way for them to express themself, their art, and their activism.

Name selection 
Nehanda used to go by the name, KiNG. They got the name from a freestyle rap they did including the line "ain't no queen when I can rule like a king." 

Walela means ‘hummingbird’ and Nehanda received the name from an elder during a rite of passage. They chose the last name "Nehanda" after Nehanda Charwe Nyakasikana, out of admiration for Nyakasikana's struggle during Chimurenga against British colonization.

Interest in writing 
At the age of 19, Nehanda reluctantly attended a poetry slam at Barnard and was surprised by the power and presence of Black women owning their stories. Nehanda began writing poetry shortly afterwards as a way to cope with being sexually assaulted. Nehanda attended weekly poetry slams at Da Poetry Lounge in Los Angeles. Nehanda credits writing poetry with saving their life. They released their first poetry album Baptism in 2016, including piano arrangements Nehanda created.

At age 22, Nehanda represented Da Poetry Lounge at the National Poetry Slam competition, alongside teammates Tonya Ingram and Alyesha Wise.

Activism

Resurrection 
In April 2018, the Los Angeles County Police Department (LAPD) fatally shot 30-year old, Grechario Mack, who was schizophrenic and on new medication, at the Baldwin Hills Crenshaw Plaza mall. Nehanda and their partner had left the mall only minutes before the murder of Mack occurred, leaving them traumatized. In 2019, Nehanda released the EP Resurrection, with the title song addressing the murder and the grief of never feeling safe as a Black person in America. The artivist EP is inspired by Black activists and thinkers Toni Cade Bambara, Assata Shakur, Tupac, Gil-Scott Heron, Frantz Fanon, and Octavia Butler. Black Voice News said the project, "exemplifies what it means to be an artist and an organizer, while proving that neither exists in a vacuum" and praised Nehanda's "surreal soundscape and vibrant wordplay".

The Assata Bukhari Collective 
In 2018, Nehanda began facilitating a weekly open mic and workshop called Spit Justice, alongside The Assata Bukhari Collective, which Nehanda belongs to. A-BC consists of Black predominately femme, queer, working class organizers local to South Central. Alongside their open mics, Spit Justice holds community conversations around police violence, gentrification, colonialism, and other topics to strengthen participants' emotional literacy, critical thinking, and  problem solving rooted in grassroots organizing. The Assata Bukhari Collective distributes free hot food, clothes, and hygiene products to low-income people. The group also hosts teen and adult healing circles, each twice a month, and weekly movement-building study groups.

Disability activism 
In 2020, Nehanda searched for days for a Lysol disinfectant spray, but was unable to find it on their own, due to the shortages caused by the pandemic. Panicked, Nehanda, posted on Twitter seeking assistance, and found a community of people offering to help them get their needs met. This inspired Nehanda to create mutual aid documents that helped get needed supplies to 200 immunocompromised people during the early days of the pandemic.

Nehanda has gotten 6,430 people registered with the lifesaving bone marrow donor list through Be the Match.

Cancer

Diagnosis 
In 2017, at age 23, Nehanda found out they had advanced-stage chronic myeloid leukemia when a doctor found Nehanda had a 600% higher white blood cell count than what's considered normal. Nehanda had experienced symptoms for years before being diagnosed, but had associated the symptoms with the stress of being homeless and poor. Nehanda attempted two oral chemotherapies that were unsuccessful at treating the leukemia.

In 2019, Nehanda told Nylon that when they first began seeking answers for their physical symptoms, they were accused by providers of being "an addict" malingering for medication they didn't need. If a nurse hadn't advocated for a blood test, Nehanda would have received treatment for their condition too late.

Treatment based on appearance 
Nehanda has spoken out against the compliments they received on their weight loss when they first began experiencing cancer symptoms. They've expressed these comment were dangerous because they normalized and celebrated a warning sign. Nehanda struggled with an eating disorder for over a decade leading up to their leukemia diagnosis. They have stated the emphasis media, hospitals, and nonprofits put on cancer-patients looking like frail, thin, bald, white women has negatively influenced health care professionals' treatment of Nehanda as a fat, Black, queer cancer patient.

Experiences during COVID-19 
In 2020, Nehanda spoke to Anthony Padilla about the shame they initially felt about being immunocompromised, due to their inability to work, and the internalized ableism they've had to work through. During the interview, Nehanda also commented on experiencing racial profiling as a Black person, wearing a face mask in stores in Los Angeles during the pandemic, and getting involved in mutual aid efforts to help low-income disabled people survive isolation.

Transplant 
In February 2019, Nehanda called a suicide hotline, which reminded them of their training as a teen working at a hotline. They remembered that often folks calling those numbers wanted to live and needed resources. Nehanda hung up before a hotline worker could answer, and contacted their therapist for support. They were referred to a psychiatrist, who diagnosed Nehanda with PTSD, depression, and anxiety. Nehanda credits the self-care and provider-care they received for their mental health with giving them the strength to want to live and pursue a bone marrow transplant.

In 2020, at age 26, they received a bone marrow transplant, during the initial panic and danger of the COVID-19 pandemic.

References 

21st-century American poets
African-American poets
American disability rights activists
American medical journalists
American online journalists
American public speakers
African-American feminists
American feminist writers
Feminist theorists
LGBT African Americans
Living people
21st-century African-American writers
American non-binary writers
Year of birth missing (living people)